Callignee is a locality in the Gippsland region of Victoria, Australia. At the 2006 census, Callignee and the surrounding area had a population of 495.

The locality was severely affected by the Black Saturday bushfires, including four fatalities plus another fatality at nearby Upper Callignee.

References

Towns in Victoria (Australia)
City of Latrobe